The Cathedral Peaks form a rugged mountain mass surmounted by several conspicuous peaks, located north of Lubbock Ridge and extending for about  along the eastern margin of Shackleton Glacier. From the glacier the peaks resemble the spires and turrets of a cathedral. They were named by F. Alton Wade, who worked in this area as leader of the Texas Tech Shackleton Glacier Party, 1962–63.

References 

Mountains of the Ross Dependency
Dufek Coast